Angela White (born 1985) is an Australian pornographic actress.

Angela White may also refer to:

Angela White (athlete), Australian athlete
Blac Chyna, American model and entrepreneur, born as Angela White
Angela Whyte, Canadian athlete
Dagmar Braun Celeste, ordained under the pseudonym "Angela White" as one of the Danube Seven
Angie White, musician in Parker Trio